Albay's 2nd congressional district is one of the three congressional districts of the Philippines in the province of Albay. It has been represented in the House of Representatives of the Philippines since 1916 and earlier in the Philippine Assembly from 1907 to 1916. The district consists of Albay's capital city of Legazpi and adjacent municipalities of Camalig, Daraga, Manito and Rapu-Rapu. It is currently represented in the 19th Congress by Joey Salceda of the Lakas–CMD.

Representation history

Election results

2022

2019

2016

2013

2010

See also
Legislative districts of Albay

References

Congressional districts of the Philippines
Politics of Albay
1907 establishments in the Philippines
Congressional districts of the Bicol Region
Constituencies established in 1907